Khalilabad is a town in the Sindh province of Pakistan. It is located at 25°9'40N 69°36'30E with an altitude of 9 metres (32 feet).

References

Populated places in Sindh